The 1886 California gubernatorial election was held on November 2, 1886, to elect the governor of California.

Results

References

1886
California
gubernatorial
November 1886 events